Margrit Tooman (since 1994 Kärp; born on 10 September 1971 in Pärnu) is an Estonian modern pentathlete.

In 1994 she graduated from Tallinn Pedagogical University in physical education.

In 1994 he achieved 5th place at World Modern Pentathlon Championships. 1989–1995 he become 6-times Estonian champion in modern penthathlon.

In 1994 he was named to Estonian Athlete of the Year.

References 

Living people
1994 births
Estonian female modern pentathletes
Tallinn University alumni
Sportspeople from Pärnu